Torget is the administrative centre of Hurdal municipality, Norway. It is located at the northern end of the lake Hurdalsjøen. Its population (2005) is 513.

References

Villages in Akershus